The Saba News Agency, also known as the Yemen News Agency, is the official state news agency of Yemen.

History and profile
SABA was founded on 16 November 1970 as the official news agency of North Yemen, and is headquartered in the capital Sana'a. On 22 May 1990, the agency was merged with the Aden News Agency (ANA) of South Yemen to create the Yemen News Agency Saba. The agency provides news on the Middle East and region.

It is a member of the Federation of Arab News Agencies (FANA).

Yemeni Civil War 
On 19 January 2015, the Houthis seized the agency. The agency then split into two factions: one pro-Hadi, the other pro-Houthi.

After 6 June 2021, forces of the separatist Southern Transitional Council stormed the SABA building in Aden. The rebels were reported to have closed down the building with death threats to the employees.

See also
 Communications in Yemen
 Media of Yemen
 Federation of Arab News Agencies (FANA)

References

External links
 Pro-Hadi Yemen News Agency (SABA) official website
 Pro-Houthi Yemen News Agency (SABA) official website

1970 establishments in Yemen
Government agencies established in 1970
Arab news agencies
News agencies based in Yemen
Government of Yemen